Puncturella floris is a species of sea snail, a marine gastropoda mollusk in the family Fissurellidae.

Original description
 Poppe G.T., Tagaro S.P. & Stahlschmidt P. (2015). New shelled molluscan species from the central Philippines I. Visaya. 4(3): 15–59. page(s): 16, pl. 2 figs 1–2.

References

 Poppe G.T. & Tagaro S.P. (2020). The Fissurellidae from the Philippines with the description of 26 new species. Visaya. suppl. 13: 1-131

External links
 Worms Link

Fissurellidae
Gastropods described in 2015